Vintage Vinyl is a record store in Evanston, Illinois, frequented by some of the world's most famous musicians and used as a reference in works of popular culture.

Description
Over the years the store has been a favorite haunt of many noteworthy actors, musicians and authors, many of whom have referenced it in their work.

Author Audrey Niffenegger used the store owner, Steve Kay, as a character in her bestseller, The Time Traveler's Wife.
 
While it's not uncommon to spot musicians such as Billy Corgan in the building, most of the noteworthy rock stars who frequented the store did so in the 1980s and 1990s.

There are several other independent record stores named Vintage Vinyl, including one in New Jersey , one in the Delmar Loop near St. Louis , and another one in Regina, Saskatchewan.

References

External links
Vintage Vinyl web page

Music retailers of the United States
Independent stores
Retail companies established in 1979
Companies based in Evanston, Illinois
1979 establishments in Illinois